Bena (formerly, Pampa) is an unincorporated community in Kern County, California.

The Pampa post office operated from 1889 to 1890 and again during 1901.

References

Unincorporated communities in Kern County, California
Unincorporated communities in California